Ken Barlow is a fictional character in Coronation Street.

Ken Barlow may also refer to:

 Ken Barlow (harness racing) (born 1936), American harness horse driver
 Ken Barlow (meteorologist) (born 1962), American meteorologist
 Ken Barlow (basketball) (born 1964), American basketball player